Queens Center Mall is an urban shopping mall in Elmhurst, Queens, New York City, on Queens Boulevard between 57th Avenue and Woodhaven Boulevard. Queens Center Mall is the largest mall in Queens. It is currently owned and managed by The Macerich Company, who purchased the mall in the 1990s. It has one of the highest returns in sales per square foot in the United States, with 2002 sales of $953 per square foot, almost triple the national average.

The mall is adjacent to the Woodhaven Boulevard station on the IND Queens Boulevard Line of the New York City Subway. It is across the street from the former St. Johns Hospital and the Rock Church. It is also off Exit 19 on the Long Island Expressway.

History
Queens Center Mall opened on September 12, 1973, on land previously occupied by a children's amusement park named Fairyland, a supermarket, and automobile parking. The original anchor tenants were Abraham & Straus and Ohrbach's. The mall underwent a major expansion from 2002 to 2004, nearly doubling in size as the original mall was renovated and another wing was added to the east of 92nd Street.

The mall's current anchor tenants are Macy's and JCPenney. In addition, it has a large food court in the basement.

For a limited time during the 2006 Christmas shopping season, the Macy's location in Queens Center was open 24 hours a day, becoming the first to do so. Since then, it has had all-day operating hours during every Christmas shopping season.

On March 8, 2019, the mall was evacuated when an appearance by rapper A Boogie wit da Hoodie was cancelled and fans rioted and looted stores, including the Foot Locker. The mall reopened the next day.

Anchors

Current
JCPenney (Opened in 1989)
Macy's (Opened in 1995)

Former
Ohrbach's (Opened in 1973. Closed in 1987. Replaced by Steinbach)
Steinbach (Opened in 1987. Closed in 1990. Replaced by JCPenney)
Abraham & Straus (Opened in 1973. Closed in 1995. Replaced by Macy's)

References

External links

Macerich
Shopping malls established in 1973
Shopping malls in New York City
Commercial buildings in Queens, New York
Tourist attractions in Queens, New York
Elmhurst, Queens
1973 establishments in New York City